The  or  is one of the two professional baseball leagues that constitute Nippon Professional Baseball in Japan. The winner of the league championship plays against the winner of the Pacific League in the annual Japan Series. It currently consists of six teams from around the country. Unlike the Pacific League, designated hitters are not used during Central League home games.

History 
The Central League was founded in 1949 with eight teams: four holdovers from the previous Japanese Baseball League — the Chunichi Dragons, the Hanshin Tigers, the Yomiuri Giants, and the Shochiku Robins (formerly the Taiyō Robins) — and four new teams — the Hiroshima Carp, the Kokutetsu Swallows, the Nishi Nippon Pirates, and the Taiyō Whales.

The Nishi Nippon Pirates existed for one season — they placed sixth in 1950, and the following season merged with the also Fukuoka-based Nishitetsu Clippers (a member of the Pacific League) to form the Nishitetsu Lions, who joined the Pacific League. This brought the number of Central League teams down to an ungainly arrangement of seven.

Ryuji Suzuki became president of the Central League in 1952.

In 1952, it was decided that any team ending the season with a winning percentage below .300 would be disbanded or merged with other teams. The Shochiku Robins fell into this category, and were merged with the Taiyō Whales to become the Taiyō Shochiku Robins in January 1953. This enabled the Central League to shrink  to an even number of six teams.

Ryuji Suzuki retired as CL president in 1984 after 33 years at the post.

In 2007, a new Climax Series was introduced. This playoff series was inspired by the stepladder playoff used in the Pacific League introduced in 2004 for the top three teams of the league to determine which one progressed to the Japan Series. Under the previous system, there was no post-season playoff and the winner of the pennant automatically qualified for the Japan Series.

Current teams

Central League pennant winners
2022 Tokyo Yakult Swallows
2021 Tokyo Yakult Swallows
2020 Yomiuri Giants
2019 Yomiuri Giants
2018 Hiroshima Toyo Carp
2017 Hiroshima Toyo Carp
2016 Hiroshima Toyo Carp 
2015 Tokyo Yakult Swallows
2014 Yomiuri Giants
2013 Yomiuri Giants
2012 Yomiuri Giants
2011 Chunichi Dragons
2010 Chunichi Dragons
2009 Yomiuri Giants
2008 Yomiuri Giants
2007 Yomiuri Giants
2006 Chunichi Dragons
2005 Hanshin Tigers
2004 Chunichi Dragons
2003 Hanshin Tigers  
2002 Yomiuri Giants 
2001 Yakult Swallows 
2000 Yomiuri Giants  
1999 Chunichi Dragons  
1998 Yokohama BayStars  
1997 Yakult Swallows  
1996 Yomiuri Giants  
1995 Yakult Swallows 
1994 Yomiuri Giants  
1993 Yakult Swallows  
1992 Yakult Swallows  
1991 Hiroshima Toyo Carp  
1990 Yomiuri Giants 
1989 Yomiuri Giants  
1988 Chunichi Dragons  
1987 Yomiuri Giants  
1986 Hiroshima Toyo Carp  
1985 Hanshin Tigers
1984 Hiroshima Toyo Carp 
1983 Yomiuri Giants 
1982 Chunichi Dragons  
1981 Yomiuri Giants  
1980 Hiroshima Toyo Carp  
1979 Hiroshima Toyo Carp  
1978 Yakult Swallows  
1977 Yomiuri Giants  
1976 Yomiuri Giants  
1975 Hiroshima Toyo Carp  
1974 Chunichi Dragons 
1973 Yomiuri Giants  
1972 Yomiuri Giants  
1971 Yomiuri Giants  
1970 Yomiuri Giants  
1969 Yomiuri Giants  
1968 Yomiuri Giants  
1967 Yomiuri Giants  
1966 Yomiuri Giants  
1965 Yomiuri Giants  
1964 Hanshin Tigers  
1963 Yomiuri Giants  
1962 Hanshin Tigers 
1961 Yomiuri Giants  
1960 Taiyo Whales  
1959 Yomiuri Giants  
1958 Yomiuri Giants  
1957 Yomiuri Giants  
1956 Yomiuri Giants  
1955 Yomiuri Giants  
1954 Chunichi Dragons  
1953 Yomiuri Giants 
1952 Yomiuri Giants  
1951 Yomiuri Giants  
1950 Shochiku Robins

Climax Series winners 
2021 Tokyo Yakult Swallows
2020 Yomiuri Giants
2019 Yomiuri Giants
2018 Hiroshima Toyo Carp
2017 Yokohama DeNA BayStars
2016 Hiroshima Toyo Carp
2015 Tokyo Yakult Swallows
2014 Hanshin Tigers
2013 Yomiuri Giants
2012 Yomiuri Giants
2011 Chunichi Dragons
2010 Chunichi Dragons
2009 Yomiuri Giants
2008 Yomiuri Giants
2007 Chunichi Dragons

Central League statistics

Most Valuable Pitcher
See: Best Nine Award#Other notes

Best Nine Awards

See also
 
 Pacific League

References

External links 
  Official website
 Japanese Baseball Data Archive at The Baseball Guru
 List of players at Japanese Baseball

1
2
1949 establishments in Japan
Sports leagues established in 1949
Annual events in Japan
Professional sports leagues in Japan